Antoine Barthelemy Clot (7 November 179328 August 1868) was a French doctor known as Clot Bey while practicing in Egypt.

Early life and education
He was born at Grenoble. In 1823, he graduated in medicine and surgery at Montpellier. His thesis for Doctor of Surgery was entitled Dangers of the Instrumental Manipulation in Obstetrical Delivery.

Efforts in Egypt

During the French occupation of Egypt, Napoleon designated Kasr al-Aini a hospital for his troops in 1799, and then afterwards proposed the opening of a school to teach local Egyptian students the medicine required to treat the troops.  This is how, after practicing for a time at Marseilles, Clot  was invited by Muhammad Ali, Viceroy of Egypt to direct the Kasr al-Aini (Qasral-‘Ayni) School of Medicine at the Army hospital of Abou Zabel which later transferred to Cairo.

The Viceroy of Egypt was determined to keep his army in good health and had sent emissaries to recruit doctors in Europe. On 24 January 1825, Clot sailed for Cairo on the Bonne Emilie with 20 other European doctors destined to assist him. Clot arrived in Egypt with the title of Surgeon-in-Chief of the Armies. As there was no medical care system in Egypt at that time, he began by instituting French Army regulations for the Egyptian army camps.

The Army Medical School had a difficult beginning with religious officials set against dissection of corpses for anatomy lessons, but this was the foundation for modern medicine in Egypt. Clot was made chief surgeon to Muhammad Ali Pasha, viceroy of Egypt, at Abu Zabal, near Cairo. He shaped the Kasr El Aini Hospital and schools for all branches of medical instruction, as well as facilities for the study of the French language; and, notwithstanding the most serious religious difficulties, instituted the study of anatomy by means of dissection.

In 1832, Muhammad Ali allowed Clot to establish a  School of Medicine for women; In the same year, Muhammad Ali gave him the distinction of bey without requiring him to abjure his religion. In 1836 he received the rank of general, and was appointed head of medical administration for the entire country.

Return to France

In 1849 he returned to Marseilles, though he revisited Egypt in 1856.
He died in Marseilles in 1868, aged 74.

Publications 
 (1832)
 (1840)
 (1840)
 (1851)
 (1864)

 (ed Jacques Tagher) (1949)

Legacy
 A street in his hometown of Grenoble was named after him. 
 A street in Marseille where he studied and lived was named after him.
 A street in down town Cairo was named after him.
 Many statues of him are present at Kasr El Aini Hospital and in its museum.
 The thick-billed lark (Rhamphocoris clotbey), a North African and Middle Eastern desert bird, was named in Clot's honour by naturalist Charles Lucien Bonaparte.

References

1793 births
1868 deaths
19th-century French physicians
Physicians from Grenoble
Physicians from Marseille
19th-century people from the Ottoman Empire
Qasr El Eyni Hospital
19th-century physicians from the Ottoman Empire